HAK or Hak may refer to:
 Hak (mythology), an Ancient Egyptian deity
Croatian Auto Club
Haikou Meilan International Airport, in Hainan Province, China
Hakka Chinese (ISO 639 code hak)
Hamari Adhuri Kahani, a 2015 Bollywood film
Armenian National Congress (Armenian:)
Harold & Kumar, a series of American comedy films

People

Surname
 Mads Hak (died 1555), Danish composer
 Miroslav Hák (1911–1978), Czech photographer
 Pavel Hak (born 1962), Czech-born French playwright and author
 Yvonne Hak (born 1986), Dutch middle-distance runner

Given name
 Hak (musician) (born 1994), American rapper and singer
 Hak Ja Han (born 1943), Korean religious leader

Others
 Henry Kissinger (born 1923), former US Secretary of State, whose initials HAK were routinely used by his senior staff in memos and disc
 The Sandman (wrestler) (born 1963), American wrestler who has used the ring name Hak

Places 
 Hak, Saskatchewan, Canada in the Rural Municipality of Swift Current
 Minkend, a Kurdish village in Azerbaijan, known as Hak in Armenian

See also 
 Hack (disambiguation)